During the 1999–2000 English football season, Watford F.C. competed in the FA Premier League, after being promoted from the First Division last season.

Season summary
Watford managed some encouraging early results, including victories over Liverpool and Chelsea, suggesting that experienced manager Graham Taylor might be able to keep the club in the Premier League against all expectations. However, after the victory against Chelsea on 18 September, Watford only managed three more wins all season, and it soon became obvious that this campaign was a bridge too far after two successive promotions. The club were eventually relegated with the then-lowest points total in Premier League history, although observers widely predicted that Taylor would at least stabilise the club in Division One again, and maybe even get the club to make an immediate return to the Premiership.

Final league table

Results summary

Results by matchday

Results
Watford's score comes first

Legend

FA Premier League

FA Cup

League Cup

Players

First-team squad
Squad at end of season

Left club during season

Reserve squad

Transfers

In

Out

Transfers in:  £3,400,000
Transfers out:  £335,000
Total spending:  £3,065,000

Statistics

Appearances

Starting 11
Considering starts in all competitions
Considering a 5-3-2 formation
 GK: #1,  Alec Chamberlain, 31
 RWB: #36,  Neil Cox, 21
 CB: #5,  Steve Palmer, 42
 CB: #4,  Rob Page, 40
 CB: #32,  Mark Williams, 22
 LWB: #6,  Paul Robinson, 33
 CM: #8,  Micah Hyde, 37
 CM: #10,  Richard Johnson, 22
 CM: #3,  Peter Kennedy, 20
 CF: #7,  Michel Ngonge, 19
 CF: #14,  Nordin Wooter, 18

References

Notes

Watford F.C. seasons
Watford